Anthony Marwood  is a British solo violinist.

Early life 
He was born 6 July 1965 to Michael Travers Marwood and Anne née Chevallier. He attended King Edward VI Grammar School in Chelmsford. He then studied at the Royal Academy of Music and the Guildhall School of Music and Drama. His teachers included Emanuel Hurwitz and David Takeno.

Career 
In the summer of 2021 Marwood performed the Ligeti Violin Concerto in the Koussevitsky Shed at Tanglewood Music Festival under the baton of Thomas Ades, and in October 2021 he will play as soloist with the Amsterdam Sinfonietta in the Concertgebouw Grote Zaal in Amsterdam. He was Artistic Director of the Irish Chamber Orchestra from 2006 to 2011. From 1995 to 2012, he was a member of the Florestan Trio with Susan Tomes and Richard Lester. He was Principal Artistic Partner with Les Violons du Roy from 2015 to 2019, and Artist in Residence at the Det Norske Kammerorkester in 2016/17. Marwood has performed contemporary violin concertos by Samuel Adams (composer), Sally Beamish, and Steven Mackey. Thomas Adès composed his violin concerto ('Concentric Paths') for Marwood. He has recorded commercially over 50 CD recordings for such labels as Hyperion and EMI Classics.

In 2006, Marwood won the Royal Philharmonic Society's Instrumentalist of the Year Award. In the Queen's New Year's Honours List 2018, he was given an MBE.

References

External links 
 Official website of Anthony Marwood
 Colbert Artists Management Inc. agency page on Anthony Marwood

English classical violinists
British male violinists
People educated at King Edward VI Grammar School, Chelmsford
Living people
Alumni of the Royal Academy of Music
Members of the Order of the British Empire
21st-century classical violinists
21st-century British male musicians
1965 births
Male classical violinists